Memorial Drive, colloquially referred to as Mem Drive, is a  parkway along the north bank of the Charles River in Cambridge, Massachusetts. 

The parkway runs parallel to two major Boston parkways, Soldiers Field Road and Storrow Drive, which lie on the south bank of the river. The western terminus is in West Cambridge at Greenough Boulevard and Fresh Pond Parkway. The eastern terminus is at Main Street and the Longfellow Bridge near Kendall Square. Memorial Drive is designated as U.S. Route 3 for most of its length, except the easternmost  which are designated as Massachusetts Route 3 (US 3 and Route 3 connect end-to-end and are treated as one continuous route by the state). Route 2 is cosigned with US 3 on Memorial Drive between the western terminus and the Boston University Bridge.

History

Formerly known as Charles River Road, the road was officially renamed "Memorial Drive" in 1923, when Charles River Park was taken over by the Metropolitan District Commission. It is named in honor of those who died in World War I.

In 2003, a two-mile section of Memorial Drive was reconstructed as part of the DCR's Historic Parkways Initiative.

Route description
Memorial Drive begins in West Cambridge, signed as US 3 south and Route 2 east, at a three-way junction (a former rotary) with Greenough Boulevard (which continues roughly westward along the river and provides access to the Eliot Bridge) and Fresh Pond Parkway, which runs roughly north and carries the US 3 / Route 2 concurrency westward.  It proceeds generally southward, following the sinuous curves of the river, from which it is separated by a strip of parkland that varies considerably in its width.  In the western stretch it has four undivided lanes, two in each direction, although parking is permitted on the outer westbound lane for a short section west of JFK Street.  

After crossing River Street it turns more eastward at the Magazine Street beach, with Route 2 diverging southward at a rotary-like interchange with overpass to cross the BU Bridge into Boston.  Soon afterward the road is lined on the north by the buildings of the main Massachusetts Institute of Technology (MIT) campus.  A grassy median is introduced along this stretch, and the road crosses under Massachusetts Avenue (Route 2A), with ramps providing limited interchange options - due to the extremely low clearance of 9 ft (2.74 m), all trucks and buses must detour via the ramps. Heading eastbound, the designation changes from US 3 to Route 3 at this interchange (and vice versa westbound). The grassy median continues to divide the road until its end near Kendall Square at the Longfellow Bridge. Edwin H. Land Boulevard splits off and continues north towards O'Brien Highway (Route 28) and Interstate 93.  Route 3 turns east onto the Longfellow Bridge and also crosses into Boston. The median, where present, has occasional opportunities for reversing direction.

Memorial Drive, like the parkways along the opposite (Boston) side of the river, is maintained by the Massachusetts Department of Conservation and Recreation, the successor to the Metropolitan District Commission.  In keeping with the recreational mission, the section of Memorial Drive from Western Avenue to the split by Mount Auburn Hospital, at Gerry's Landing Road, is closed to motor vehicles on Sundays in the summer to allow for pedestrian and non-motorized users. The closure is in effect from 11 am to 7 pm starting the last Sunday of April until the second Sunday of November.

A median near Massachusetts Avenue requires executing a so-called Michigan left for certain turns.

Near the Magazine Street intersection, the Shell Oil Company "Spectacular" Sign sits on top of its namesake station (first appearing there in 1944). It is one of two oil company signs that currently hold Boston Landmark status (the Citgo sign behind Fenway Park is the other).

Major intersections
The entire route is in Cambridge, Middlesex County.

See also
Soldiers Field Road and Storrow Drive, on the Boston side of the river
Charles River Bike Path
List of crossings of the Charles River
Charles River Reservation#Riverbend Park
Charles River Reservation

References

Parkways in Massachusetts
Streets in Cambridge, Massachusetts
U.S. Route 3